Warrawong Plaza  (formerly Westfield Warrawong) is a major shopping centre located in Warrawong, a suburb of Wollongong, New South Wales, Australia.

History and development
Warrawong Plaza originally opened in 1960 as Lake Market Shopping Centre. 

The centre has a current catchment area of 246,680 persons, and retail spending in the catchment area estimated at 2.3 billion (2005).

Redevelopments
Upon acquisition by The Westfield Group in 1985, the centre was extensively redeveloped and relaunched as Westfield Warrawong in 1988. Further extensions were conducted in 1996, adding a  Big W to the centre.

Previously, a Big W department store had been an occupant of the centre from 1965, however due to a change in retailing strategy by parent company Woolworths Limited, the then-two-level store was sold to David Jones Limited on 19 April 1971 and converted to a David Jones store which in turn was closed in January 1986.

Acquisition by The Blackstone Group
In August 2015, Scentre Group announced it had sold Westfield Warrawong to 151 Property, a subsidiary of The Blackstone Group along with three other centres as part of sell-off of "non-strategic" assets for a total of $783 Million. At the same time it was announced that Jones Lang LaSalle would be responsible for the management of the centre.

On 11 September 2015, the new management unveiled the new name, Warrawong Plaza, and branding going forward.

Events
In 1999, the centre received significant global coverage of its efforts to deal with shoplifting and anti-social behaviour. In an effort to discourage local youth using the centre as a gathering place, the management used the centre's public address system to play older style music, including Bing Crosby's 1938 song "My Heart Is Taking Lessons".

On 21 September 2004, a man sitting beside a tree outside the centre was the victim of a vehicle accident. The man died after being hit by an out of control sedan as he sat next to a tree outside the centre.

In March 2005, local bus company Premier Illawarra gave serious consideration to suspending one of its Thursday evening services from the centre due to months of increased vandalism and anti-social behaviour in surrounding streets around the centre. Despite the efforts of bus inspectors and transit police, very little had been achieved to curb the problems.

Transport
The centre is serviced by a public bus service operated by Premier Illawarra.

Facilities
Major retailers of Warrawong Plaza include Coles, Aldi, Target, BIG W, Hoyts, TK Maxx, JB Hi-Fi, Rebel, Best and Less and Lincraft.

References

External links

Shopping centres in New South Wales
Buildings and structures in Wollongong
Former Westfield centres in Australia
Shopping malls established in 1960
1960 establishments in Australia